Prashanti Singh (born 5 May 1984, Varanasi, Uttar Pradesh) is a shooting guard for the Indian national women's basketball team. She is first basketball player in India conferred with National Civilian Award Padma Shri in 2019. She has been honoured with the Arjuna Award by the Ministry of Youth Affairs and Sports, Government of India in 2017. She has also been conferred with the prestigious Rani Laxmi Bai Bravery Award 2016–17 in the field of sports by Government of Uttar Pradesh.

Prashanti represented the national team at 2006 Commonwealth Games, 16th Asian Games in Guangzhou, China in 2010 and 17th Asian Games in Incheon 2014. Her sisters Divya Singh, Akanksha Singh, and Pratima Singh, have also represented the Indian national women's basketball team. Another sister, Priyanka Singh, is a National Institute of Sports basketball coach. Together they are also known as Singh Sisters.

Playing career 

Prashanti joined the Indian women's basketball team in 2002 and soon became its captain. She played as captain in 3rd Asian Indoor Games which were held in Vietnam on 30 October – 8 November 2009 where the team won a Silver medal. Prashanti won Gold Medal in South Asian Beach Games at Sri Lanka in 2011.

Prashanti Singh is most decorated woman basketball player in India. She is one of the top four A grade player of India selected and sponsored by Basketball Federation of India & IMG-Reliance.

She has won 22 medals in the National Championships, National Games and Federation Cups in India. She holds the national record of having most medals at senior level in National Championships for one state team. She is first woman Basketball player in India to represent the National team in one 2006 Commonwealth Games & two Asian Games 2010, 2014 respectively.

She is also a member of the International Women's Film Forum of Asian Academy of Film & Television. Prashanti Singh is first and only basketball player in India who has a documentary film named B Cube (Boskey Basketball Banaras) on her own life which is selected in top xix films in the prestigious Satyajit Ray Film Festival.

International sporting achievements

National sporting achievement

Awards and achievement

 March 2019 : Padma Shri by Government of India
 August 2017 : Arjuna Award by Government of India
 December 2016-17 : Rani Laxmi Bai Award (Outstanding Sports Person) by Uttar Pradesh Government
 December 2015-16 : Poorvanchal Ratna (Top Sports Person)
 October 2015 : Shakti Samman by APN News
 March 2015 : UP ke Sartaj titled by Radio Mirchi 98.3 FM.
 January 2015 : National record with 23 medals for one team in senior level.
 June 2013: Lokmat Samman (sportsperson of the year 2013) in Lucknow.
 October 2012: MVP (most valuable player) of Mahindra NBA challenge National Final in New Delhi.
 April 2011: Captained team West & won Best Player award in All Star Game in Mumbai.
 February 2011: Top scorer award with 129 points (25.8-point/game) in prestigious 25th IMG-Reliance Federation Cup, Raipur
 2011: She is one of the first ever ranked Top Four A Grade elite Basketball player of India.
 2010: Elle Magazine - first Indian basketball player featured in the May 2010 edition
 October 2006: Century Sports Award by Century Sports Club, Varanasi
 August 2006: Outstanding Player Honour by UP College Old Students' Association
 December 2002: Best Player Award in UP State School Championship, held at Ghaziabad

Early life and academics 

Prashanti is originally from Varanasi and moved to Delhi for her career. In Delhi, she trained and joined MTNL team. She is a graduate in Arts from University of Delhi, India.

Family
Prashanti singh belongs to a famous basketball family of India. They are known as the “Singh Sisters”. She belongs to Solanki Rajput family of  Varanasi.
Three of her sisters currently are a member of the Indian women's national basketball team.
 Sister Divya Singh (Currently Student and working with University of Delaware women's basketball team)
 Sister Akanksha Singh (Currently member of India women's national basketball team)
 Sister Pratima Singh (India women's national basketball team player), wife of Ishant Sharma

References 

https://www.thehindu.com/news/cities/Delhi/meet-prashanti-singh-the-only-basketball-player-to-be-awarded-the-padma-shri/article28630157.ece

External links
 Profile at EuroBasket
Official Website

Indian women's basketball players
Living people
1984 births
Sportswomen from Uttar Pradesh
Commonwealth Games competitors for India
Basketball players from Varanasi
Basketball players at the 2010 Asian Games
Basketball players at the 2014 Asian Games
21st-century Indian women
21st-century Indian people
Asian Games competitors for India
Guards (basketball)
Singh sisters
Recipients of the Padma Shri in sports
Recipients of the Arjuna Award
Basketball players at the 2006 Commonwealth Games